Jane Elizabeth den Hollander  is an Australian University Administrator and was the sixth Vice-Chancellor of Deakin University. Den Hollander is currently serving as the Interim Vice Chancellor of Murdoch University.

Background and early career
Den Hollander was born in Zambia and grew up in a small South African gold mining town. Her father was a miner from Northern Ireland and her mother was from Liverpool, England. She is the eldest of four children, and the first member of her family to go to university. Her academic achievements include a Bachelor of Science in zoology with first class honours, and a Master of Science from Wits University. She did her PhD at the University of Wales on the topic of early stem cell work. Her subsequent academic career focussed on cellular biology, biochemistry and stem cell research.

Career
Den Hollander is the architect of LIVE the future a strategic intent that aspires for Deakin University to capitalise on new and emerging technologies and drive the digital frontier in higher education. She previously held senior management positions at the University of Western Australia and Curtin University as Deputy Vice-Chancellor.

Den Hollander is currently a board member of Universities Australia, Education Australia Limited, and UniSuper, a member of the advisory board of the Office of Learning and Teaching, and a trustee of the Geelong Performing Arts Council.

From 2005 to 2008, den Hollander was a board member of Graduate Careers Australia, and from 2008 to 2011 on the board of the Australian Learning and Teaching Council.

In the 2017 Australia Day Honours, den Hollander was appointed an Officer of the Order of Australia for "distinguished service to tertiary education through a range of executive administration and advisory roles, as a supporter of professional educational organisations, and to the community".

Personal life
In Britain she met her future husband, a biologist from Western Australia with whom she has two children. The family returned to Perth in 1996.

References

Year of birth missing (living people)
Living people
Academic staff of Deakin University
Officers of the Order of Australia
Australian people of Zambian descent
Alumni of the University of Wales
University of the Witwatersrand alumni
Australian biologists